Cheltenham Racecourse at Prestbury Park, near Cheltenham, Gloucestershire, England, hosts National Hunt horse racing. Racing at Cheltenham took place in 1815, but comprised only minor flat races on Nottingham Hill. The first racing on Cleeve Hill was on Tuesday 25 August 1818 when the opening race was won by Miss Tidmarsh, owned by Mr E Jones. It was a year later when the results were printed in the Racing Calendar  when a programme of flat racing was watched by the Duke of Gloucester who  donated 100 Guineas to the prize fund. By 1831 races were being staged at  Prestbury, although not on the present day course. In 1834 the Grand Annual Steeplechase was run for the first time. In 1839 Lottery  won the Grand Annual having previously won the first Aintree Grand  National. In 1840 the meeting transferred to Andoversford for a brief  period, only to return to Prestbury in 1847.                                                                                               1902 was a notable year in that racing moved to the present course at Prestbury Park. The new stands were  completed in 1914 and the present day Festival races, as we know them, began to  take shape. The Cheltenham Gold Cup, over 3 ¼ miles, was run for the first  time in 1924, with the Champion Hurdle following in 1927.

The course's most prestigious meeting is the Cheltenham Festival, held in March, which features several Grade I races including the Cheltenham Gold Cup, Champion Hurdle, Queen Mother Champion Chase, Ryanair Chase and the Stayers' Hurdle.

The racecourse has a scenic location in a natural amphitheatre, just below the escarpment of the Cotswold Hills at Cleeve Hill, with a capacity of 67,500 spectators. Cheltenham Racecourse railway station no longer connects to the national rail network, but is the southern terminus of the preserved Gloucestershire Warwickshire Railway.

The main racecourse has two separate courses alongside each other, the Old Course and the New Course. The New Course has a tricky downhill fence and a longer run-in for steeplechases than the Old Course. Hurdle races over two miles on the New Course also have a slight peculiarity in that most of the hurdles are jumped early on in the race with only two hurdles being jumped in the last seven furlongs. The Old Course is the racecourse used for The Showcase, The November Meeting and the first two days of the Cheltenham Festival. There is also a cross-country course which is laid out inside the main racecourse and is used for cross-country steeplechases.

The racecourse is the home of The Centaur, one of the largest auditoria in the South West of England. This multiple-use complex seats over 2,000 people for conferences and around 4,000 standing for concerts. It is also home to the Steeplechasing Hall of Fame. From 1999 to 2013, the racecourse was the venue for the annual Greenbelt festival and remains the venue for the Wychwood Music Festival. The University of Gloucestershire holds its graduation ceremony and summer ball at the racecourse.

From 2008, the racecourse and The Jockey Club were in talks with Cheltenham Town F.C. about a possible move to the racecourse. This would have meant the building of a new stadium with a double-sided stand, one side in the stadium and the other for watching the races. In 2011, Cheltenham Town F.C. decided against the move for financial reasons.

In 2015,  Cheltenham Racecourse opened the £45m 6,500-capacity Princess Royal Stand, which completed the redevelopment of the course.

Notable races

References

  BBC (2011). 
  BBC (2005). New developments at Cheltenham Racecourse . Retrieved November 14, 2005.

External links
Cheltenham Racecourse (Official website)
 Follow the National Hunt Festival '08 with BBC Gloucestershire
Go behind the scenes with BBC Gloucestershire's Virtual Cheltenham 
 Panoramic photos of Cheltenham Racecourse 

 
Horse racing venues in England
Racecourse